Thomas or Tom Pearce may refer to:

 Thomas Pearce (British Army officer) (c. 1670–1739), British army lieutenant general and Member of Parliament
 Thomas Pearce (priest) (1820–1885), English clergyman, known under the pseudonym "Idstone" as an author on dogs
 Thomas Pearce (cricketer, born 1847) (1847–1898), English cricketer
 Thomas Ernest Pearce (1883–1941), British businessman and member of the Legislative Council of Hong Kong
 Thomas Pearce (MP), Member of Parliament for Weymouth and Melcombe Regis (1722–1737)
 Tom Pearce (cricketer) (1905–1994), English cricketer and rugby union official
 Tom Pearce (footballer) (born 1998), English footballer for Wigan Athletic
 Tom Pearce, a cast member of the British semi-reality television programme The Only Way Is Essex
 Alec Pearce (Thomas Alexander Pearce, 1910–1982), English cricketer
 Thomas Richard Pearce, (1859–1908), Irish sea captain.
 "Widecombe Fair" (song), also called Tom Pearce, Devon folk song

See also
 Thomas Pierce or Peirse (1622–1691), English churchman and controversialist